Ince railway station serves the Ince area of Metropolitan Borough of Wigan, Greater Manchester. The station is on the Manchester-Southport Line 17¼ miles (28 km) north west of Manchester Victoria.

Until November 1964, Ince was also served by a station at Lower Ince on the line from Wigan Central to Glazebrook (to the now closed Manchester Central).

Ince suffered in the 1960s and 1970s from much house clearance and landscaping. This has resulted in low passenger usage for the station which served an area which was (until the 1960s) a bustling independent town. Ince (unlike Daisy Hill and Hindley, and other stations on the line) is not a commuter dormitory suburb and now the station is deserted even at peak times. Usage figures increased by around 10% in 2006/07 and recently by greater amounts (around 25% in 2007/08, and 29% in 2010-11) albeit from a relatively low base.

There are three seats, with a new shelter that contains benches. There is also a newly installed LED next train indicator sign (which the station did not previously have) and a payphone. A series of improvement works during June and July 2018 to the station added an array of CCTV cameras and a new Card-Only ticket machine.  The station is entirely unstaffed and customers must obtain tickets from the ticket machine on the platform. those wishing to pay for their ticket with cash must use the ticket machine to obtain a 'Promise to Pay' and pay the conductor on the train.

Services
The station is served by an hourly service in each direction to Manchester Victoria via  and to  respectively. A small number of services to and from  call during the morning peak.

There is an hourly daytime Sunday service to Wigan,  and Manchester Victoria (via Atherton) in the current (Winter 2022) timetable.

Future and electrification
The line between Wigan and Bolton has been given government approval to electrify and upgrade. Various bridges are being modified and rebuilt to make way for this. Ince station will thus have electrification hardware in the future.

Notes

External links

 Disused-stations.org (see Lower Ince)

Railway stations in the Metropolitan Borough of Wigan
DfT Category F2 stations
Former Lancashire and Yorkshire Railway stations
Northern franchise railway stations
Railway stations in Great Britain opened in 1888
1888 establishments in England